Siwa may refer to:

Places
 Siwa Oasis, an oasis in Egypt
 Siwa, Panchthar, a Village Development Committee in Nepal
 140 Siwa, a main-belt asteroid

People and characters
 Siwa or Shiva, a Hindu god
 Siwa or Ziva, a Slavic goddess of fertility
 JoJo Siwa (born 2003), American dancer, singer, actress, and YouTube personality
 Siwa Prommas (born 1985), Thai soccer player

Other uses 
 Siwa (spider), a genus in the family Araneidae
 Siwa language, a Berber language of Egypt
 Siwa culture, a Bronze Age culture in Gansu, China
 Siwa (beer), a type of Ethiopian beer
 Sign in with Apple (SIWA), a single sign-on provider operated by Apple
 Scottish Inland Waterways Association
 Siwa, a defunct brand of convenience stores in Finland acquired by Kesko

See also

 
 Siva (disambiguation)
 Shiva (disambiguation)